Chieming is a municipality in the district of Traunstein in Bavaria, Germany.

Etymology 

The name Chieming, Chiemsee and the name of the area Chiemgau go back to the Old High German personal name Chiemo (7th/8th century). At the end of the 8th century the name Chiemgau appeared for the first time in documents as Chimigaoe but it stood at that time for a smaller area around the village of Chieming.

Education 
In Chieming there are

 3 kindergartens
 a primary- and middle school,
 the Gymnasium Landschulheim Schloss Ising

References 

Traunstein (district)